Genillé is a commune in the Indre-et-Loire department in central France.

Geography
The village lies in the middle of the commune, on the right bank of the Indrois, which flows northwest through the middle of the commune and forms parts of its eastern and western borders.

Population

See also
Communes of the Indre-et-Loire department

References

Communes of Indre-et-Loire